Lewis Peter Alessandra (born 8 February 1989) is an English professional footballer who plays as a striker or winger for South Shields. He has played in the English Football League for Oldham Athletic, Morecambe, Plymouth Argyle, Rochdale, York City, Hartlepool United and Notts County and Carlisle United.

Career

Oldham Athletic

Alessandra was born in Heywood, Greater Manchester. Along with his teammate Deane Smalley, Alessandra graduated from Oldham Athletic's youth system. He was a regular in the reserve squad, receiving a contract extension in the summer of 2008. The club awarded the youngster a three-year contract.

On 20 October 2007, Alessandra made his first-team debut in a 1–1 draw versus Huddersfield Town, with his first start coming on 2 February 2008 in a loss to Swansea City. His first goal with the senior squad came at Boundary Park in a 3–1 win over Tranmere Rovers on 8 March 2008. On 26 April 2008, Alessandra scored his second league goal in the 87th minute versus Cheltenham Town, giving Oldham a 2–1 win.

In Oldham's first match of the 2008–09 season, Alessandra scored Oldham's third goal in a 4–3 victory over Millwall. He scored his first senior hat-trick on 28 October, in a 3–0 victory over Scunthorpe United.

At the beginning of the 2010–11 season, Alessandra was converted to a wide player for upcoming season by the new manager enabling him to play up front or on either wing. At the end of the campaign his contract expired and he was informed that he would not be offered a new one.

Chester City (loan)
On 31 July 2009, it was reported that Alessandra was set to join Conference Premier club Chester City on loan. The move was done with the idea of giving the player more time playing and he commented himself that "if he was not getting games with Latics, he might as well go on loan to Chester." The move was initially a trial until the club was able to sign players again. Alessandra scored in a trial match for the club against a Burnley XI and scored his second goal in two matches with an early effort against Droylsden.

After briefly returning to Oldham, Chester confirmed they had signed Alessandra on an initial one-month loan on 21 August. The following day, he made his debut in a scoreless draw versus Luton Town, playing more than 90 minutes before he was substituted for defender Kristian Platt. He made four appearances for Chester but after club was expelled from the Football Conference their record was expunged.

Morecambe
Alessandra signed for League Two club Morecambe on 23 June 2011. In two years with the club, he made 82 league appearances and scored nine goals playing in a number of different positions. He was offered a new contract at the end of the 2012–13 season and agreed to sign it but then decided against it and joined Plymouth Argyle.

Plymouth Argyle
Alessandra signed a two-year contract with Plymouth Argyle in June 2013. "I know Lewis very well, and his strengths as a striker," said Argyle manager John Sheridan, who gave him his first team debut at Oldham in 2007. "Lewis can play on the right and left of the front line as well as down the middle." Alessandra made his debut in the club's first match of the new season at Southend United, and scored two goals in a League Cup match at Birmingham City three days later. Alessandra scored his first league goal for Argyle against Northampton Town in November. In total Alessandra scored 12 goals in 49 matches in all competitions in his first season with the Pilgrims.

In November 2014, be scored his 18th goal in Argyle colours, scoring in a 3–0 win against Portsmouth. This rose Argyle up to 4th in the table, just off the automatic promotion spots. Alessandra's initial role at Plymouth was to be used as a right midfielder, where he spent the duration of the first half of the Pilgrims' 2013–14 season. Sheridan later saw the Midfielder's attacking attributes and decided to play him as a striker, alongside Reuben Reid. Alessandra ended the season with 12 goals in 49 matches, with Plymouth finishing 10th in League Two. Alessandra scored 13 goals in 51 matches the following season as his team qualified for the League 2 play-offs, but were defeated by Wycombe Wanderers in the semi-final.

Rochdale and Hartlepool United

On 8 June 2015, Alessandra signed a two-year contract with League One club Rochdale. Having had limited chances at Rochdale, he joined League Two club York City on 8 March 2016 on a one-month emergency loan. He scored in the 20th minute of his debut in a 1–1 home draw with Barnet on 12 March 2016.

On 29 June 2016, Alessandra signed for League Two club Hartlepool United on undisclosed terms, after having his contract with Rochdale cancelled by mutual consent.

Notts County and return to Morecambe
On 26 May 2017, Alessandra signed for League Two club Notts County on a two-year contract for an undisclosed fee. He was released by Notts County at the end of the 2018–19 season.

Alessandra re-signed for League Two club Morecambe on 25 July 2019 on a contract of undisclosed length.

Carlisle United
On 24 January 2020, Alessandra signed a short-term contract with Carlisle United until the end of the 2019–20 season. He scored his first goal for Carlisle in a 2–1 win against Cambridge United on 29 February 2020. Alessandra was released by the club at the end of the 2021–22.

South Shields
On 5 August 2022, Alessandra dropped out of the Football League for the first time when he signed for Northern Premier League side South Shields. Shields manager Kevin Phillips said of Alessandra's signing "He is someone who has only ever played league football, so to attract a player of his calibre is a massive coup. He brings brilliant pedigree, experience and leadership qualities, and fits well with the players we have signed this summer and those who were already here." He scored his first goal for the club on 6 September 2022 in a 2-1 win against Guiseley. On 17 September 2022, Alessandra scored a hat-trick in a 5-0 win against Shildon in the FA Cup second qualifying round.

Career statistics

References

External links

Profile at the Carlisle United F.C. website

1989 births
Living people
People from Heywood, Greater Manchester
Footballers from Greater Manchester
English footballers
Association football forwards
Oldham Athletic A.F.C. players
Chester City F.C. players
Morecambe F.C. players
Plymouth Argyle F.C. players
Rochdale A.F.C. players
York City F.C. players
Hartlepool United F.C. players
Notts County F.C. players
Carlisle United F.C. players
South Shields F.C. (1974) players
English Football League players
Northern Premier League players